Gordon Leslie Tindall (1911 – 24 June 1969) was the eighth Bishop of Grahamstown.

Tindall was educated at Hatfield College, Durham. Ordained in 1936, his first post was a curacy in Swinton. He then emigrated to Africa to become a missionary priest. From 1939 he was rector of Vryburg, then director of the South Bechuanaland Mission. Later he was archdeacon of King William's Town, then diocesan director of religious education in Grahamstown before his appointment to the episcopate.

References

1910 births
Alumni of Hatfield College, Durham
Anglican archdeacons in Africa
20th-century Anglican Church of Southern Africa bishops
Anglican bishops of Grahamstown
1969 deaths
People from Qonce